Desloratadine (trade names Clarinex and Aerius) is a tricyclic H1 inverse agonist that is used to treat allergies.  It is an active metabolite of loratadine.

It was patented in 1984 and came into medical use in 2001.

Medical uses 
Desloratadine is used to treat allergic rhinitis,  nasal congestion and chronic idiopathic urticaria (hives).  It is the major metabolite of loratadine and the two drugs are similar in safety and effectiveness. Desloratadine is available in many dosage forms and under many trade names worldwide.

An emerging indication for desloratadine is in the treatment of acne, as an inexpensive adjuvant to isotretinoin and possibly as maintenance therapy or monotherapy.

Side effects 
The most common side-effects are fatigue (1.2%), dry mouth (3%), and headache (0.6%).

Interactions 
Co-administration with erythromycin, ketoconazole, azithromycin, fluoxetine or cimetidine resulted in elevated blood plasma concentrations of desloratadine and its metabolite 3-hydroxydesloratadine in studies. However, no clinically relevant changes were observed.

Pharmacology

Pharmacodynamics 
Desloratadine is a selective H1-antihistamine which functions as an inverse agonist at the histamine H1 receptor.

At very high doses, is also an antagonist at various subtypes of the muscarinic acetylcholine receptors. This effect is not relevant for the drug's action at therapeutic doses.

Pharmacokinetics 
Desloratadine is well absorbed from the gut and reaches highest blood plasma concentrations after about three hours. In the bloodstream, 83 to 87% of the substance are bound to plasma proteins.

Desloratadine is metabolized to 3-hydroxydesloratadine in a three-step sequence in normal metabolizers. First, n-glucuronidation of desloratadine by UGT2B10; then, 3-hydroxylation of desloratadine N-glucuronide by CYP2C8; and finally, a non-enzymatic deconjugation of 3-hydroxydesloratadine N-glucuronide. Both desloratadine and 3-hydroxydesloratadine are eliminated via urine and feces with a half-life of 27 hours in normal metabolizers.

It exhibits only peripheral activity since it does not readily cross the blood–brain barrier; hence, it does not normally cause drowsiness because it does not readily enter the central nervous system.

Desloratadine does not have a strong effect on a number of tested enzymes in the cytochrome P450 system. It was found to weakly inhibit CYP2B6, CYP2D6, and CYP3A4/CYP3A5, and not to inhibit CYP1A2, CYP2C8, CYP2C9, or CYP2C19. Desloratadine was found to be a potent and relatively selective inhibitor of UGT2B10, a weak to moderate inhibitor of UGT2B17, UGT1A10, and UGT2B4, and not to inhibit UGT1A1, UGT1A3, UGT1A4, UGT1A6, UGT1A9, UGT2B7, UGT2B15, UGT1A7, and UGT1A8.

Pharmacogenomics 
2% of Caucasian people and 18% of people from African descent are desloratadine poor metabolizers. In these people, the drug reaches threefold highest plasma concentrations six to seven hours after intake, and has a half-life of about 89 hours. However, the safety profile for these subjects is not worse than for extensive (normal) metabolizers.

See also 
 Benzocycloheptenes
 Azatadine

References

External links 
 

 

Benzocycloheptapyridines
Chloroarenes
H1 receptor antagonists
Human drug metabolites
Peripherally selective drugs
Piperidines
Schering-Plough brands
Merck & Co. brands